SS Cygni is a variable star in the northern constellation Cygnus (the Swan).  It is the prototype of the subclass of dwarf novae that show only normal eruptions.  It typically rises from 12th magnitude to 8th magnitude for 1–2 days every 7 or 8 weeks.  The northerly declination of SS Cygni (about 44° N) makes the star almost circumpolar from European and North American latitudes, allowing a large proportion of the world's amateur astronomers to monitor its behavior.  Furthermore, since the star lies against the rich backdrop of the Milky Way band, the telescope field of view around SS Cygni contains an abundance of useful brightness comparison stars.

SS Cygni, like all other cataclysmic variables, consists of a close binary system. One of the components is a red dwarf-type star, cooler than the Sun, while the other is a white dwarf. Studies suggest that the stars in the SS Cygni system are separated (from surface to surface) by "only" 100,000 miles or less. The two stars are so close that they complete their orbital revolution in slightly over  hours. The inclination of the system has been calculated to be 45-56 degrees, yielding masses of 0.81 solar mass for the white dwarf primary star and 0.55  for the red dwarf secondary star.

Astronomically speaking, SS Cygni is also fairly close by. Originally thought to be at 90 to 100 light years, its distance was revised in 1952 to about 400 light years. This value is much more in accord with the old (≈400 light-year) value, and it removes completely the difficulties the larger HST distance made for the theory of dwarf novae.

References

External links
 AAVSO Variable Star of the Month. SS Cygni: June 2000

Cygnus (constellation)
Dwarf novae
206697
Cygni, SS
K-type main-sequence stars
Durchmusterung objects